The two-spotted miner bee (Andrena accepta) is a species of miner bee in the family Andrenidae. It is found in Central America and North America.

References

Further reading

External links

 

accepta
Articles created by Qbugbot
Insects described in 1916